Pontius may refer to:

People from classical antiquity
 Gaius Pontius, a Samnite general during the Second Samnite War
 Pontius Aquila, Roman politician, and one of Julius Caesar's assassins
 Pontius Pilate, or Pilatus, Roman governor of Judaea who presided over the crucifixion of Jesus
 Pontius Telesinus, Samnite leader against the Roman Republic
 Marcus Pontius Laelianus, a Roman politician and general, who held the consulship in AD 153
 Pontius of Carthage, a deacon of the early church, and author of the Life of Cyprian
 Pontius of Cimiez, early Christian martyr
 Any male member of the Pontia gens

People in modern times
 Paulus Pontius, an artist
 Chris Pontius, actor in the Jackass television series
 Chris Pontius (soccer), American soccer player for D.C. United
 Mark Pontius, a member of the American indie rock band Foster the People
 Miller Pontius (1891–1960), American football player

See also

 
 Ponce (surname)
 Pons (disambiguation)
 Pontia gens